Wesley Koolhof and Neal Skupski defeated Matthew Ebden and Max Purcell in the final, 4–6, 7–5, [10–6] to win the men's doubles tennis title at the 2022 Rosmalen Grass Court Championships.

Dominic Inglot and Austin Krajicek were the defending champions from when the event was last held in 2019, but they chose not to defend their title.

Seeds

Draw

Draw

References

External links
Main draw

Libéma Open - Men's doubles
2022 Men's doubles